Rolls-Royce North America, Inc. is a subsidiary of multinational corporation Rolls-Royce plc.  The American unit operates under a Special Security Arrangement which allows it to work independently on some of the most sensitive United States defense programs despite its foreign ownership. It is involved principally with providing management direction and corporate support for all Rolls-Royce businesses and operations in North America, encompassing more than 7,000 employees at 66 locations across the U.S. and Canada. Its headquarters are in Reston, Virginia.

The most significant part of Rolls-Royce North America is "Rolls-Royce Corporation", formerly the Allison Engine Company. Other subsidiaries include:
 Rolls-Royce Canada Limited
 Rolls-Royce Marine North America Inc.
 Rolls-Royce Defense Services, Inc. 
 Rolls-Royce North America Ventures, Inc. 
 Rolls-Royce Power Systems
 MTU America

LibertyWorks

The Allison Advanced Development Company (also known as LibertyWorks) was established in 1995 as a result of Rolls-Royce plc's acquisition of the Allison Engine Company. As well as establishing a proxy board for Allison, Rolls-Royce was required to vest Allison's classified projects in Allison Advanced Development Company. In 2005, Rolls-Royce changed the name to Rolls-Royce North American Technologies.

Notable former and current employees 

 Samuel L. Higginbottom – former chairman, president and CEO; CEO of Eastern Air Lines
 Marion Blakey – former president CEO; administrator of the Federal Aviation Administration

References

External links
 
 Rolls-Royce Opens New Regional Corporate Headquarters in Northern Virginia

Aircraft engine manufacturers of the United States
American subsidiaries of foreign companies
Companies based in Reston, Virginia
Defense companies of the United States
R